The 36th edition of the annual Vuelta a Venezuela was held from August 31 to September 12, 1999. The stage race started in Punto Fijo, and ended in Carúpano.

1999-08-31: Punto Fijo Circuito (125 km)

1999-09-01: Falcón — Tucacas (205 km)

1999-09-02: Tucacas — San Felipe (150 km)

1999-09-03: San Felipe — Acarigua (150 km)

1999-09-04: Acarigua — San Carlos (82 km)

1999-09-04: San Carlos Circuito (83 km)

1999-09-05: San Carlos — San Juan de los Morros (195 km)

1999-09-06: Ortiz — Chaguaramas (124 km)

1999-09-07: Chaguaramas — Chaguaramas (33 km)

1999-09-08: Zaraza — Cantaura (128.5 km)

1999-09-09: Anaco — Cantaura (110 km)

1999-09-10: Anaco — Cumaná (192 km)

1999-09-11: Cumaná — Carúpano (142 km)

1999-09-12: Carúpano Circuito (140 km)

Final classification

References 
 cyclebase results
 1999 results

Vuelta a Venezuela
Venezuela
Vuelta Venezuela
August 1999 sports events in South America
September 1999 sports events in South America